Isabella Santiago (February 18 1991) is a Venezuelan actress and model. Isabella is the first Venezuelan transgender actress and model to win the Thai beauty pageant Miss International Queen, for which she received an award of $12 500 US dollars and a cosmetic surgery. In 2021 she obtained her first lead role in the Colombian telenovela, Lala's Spa, at the Colombian TV network, RCN Televisión. Isabella Santiago currently resides in Bogota,Colombia.

Filmography

References 

1991 births
Venezuelan LGBT actors
Venezuelan transgender people
Transgender actresses
Transgender female models
Living people
Actors from Caracas
21st-century Venezuelan LGBT people